The Powder River is a tributary of the Snake River, approximately  long, in northeast Oregon in the United States. It drains an area of the Columbia Plateau on the eastern side of the Blue Mountains. It flows almost entirely within Baker County but downstream of the city of North Powder forms part of the border between Baker County and Union County.

Name
The name Powder River is first recorded in the journals of Peter Skene Ogden without notation of the origin of the name.  Explorer Donald Mackenzie likely named the river. William C. McKay, grandson of John Jacob Astor's partner Alexander MacKay, says that the origin of the name is from the powdery and sandy soil along the shores of the river, from the Chinook Jargon polalle illahe. It appears on Lewis and Clark's maps as Port-pel-lah.

Course
The Powder River's tributaries arise in the southern Blue Mountains in the Umatilla National Forest. The river's main stem begins in Sumpter, where McCully Fork, Cracker Creek and several smaller tributaries join, and flows east-southeast through the tailings of past dredge mining and into Phillips Reservoir. After exiting Phillips Reservoir, the river continues east for about  before turning sharply north through the Bowen Valley and Baker City, Oregon. From here the river meanders the floor of the Baker Valley and passes by the cities of Haines and North Powder, where it is joined by the North Powder River. Here the river turns again sharply east-southeast, flowing through Thief Valley Reservoir, in a valley along the southern edge of the Wallowa Mountains.

Tributaries
Major streams flowing into the Powder are Eagle Creek, Wolf Creek, Rock Creek and the North Powder River.

Watershed

The Powder River watershed drains  of northeastern Oregon. There are three man-made reservoirs on the Powder River:  Phillips Reservoir (behind Mason Dam), Thief Valley Reservoir, and also the Powder arm of Brownlee Reservoir at the Oregon–Idaho border at the confluence of the Powder and Snake Rivers.

In 1988,  of the Powder River was designated Wild and Scenic. Between the Thief Valley Dam and the Oregon Route 203 bridge, this stretch flows through a rugged canyon with spectacular geologic formations.

Flora and fauna
There, a colony of beavers constructed a large dam easily viewed below the footbridge adjacent to the paved parking area. Recovered from near extirpation by the Hudson's Bay Company, who tried to create a "fur desert" to discourage Americans from coming to the far western states, benefits of beaver in arid eastern Oregon include creating ponds which along young salmonids to grow, raising the water table as their ponds recharge groundwater supplies and creating wetlands which trap sediment and pollutants.

The Powder River was once an important spawning stream for Chinook salmon (Oncorhynchus tshawytscha) and steelhead trout (Oncorhyncus mykiss) coming from the Pacific Ocean.  Chinook salmon once migrated by the thousands to spawn in the Powder River and many of its tributaries from its headwaters to the lower end of the North Powder Valley, but that stopped when the Thief Valley Dam was built near North Powder in 1931. The building of two later dams in Hells Canyon on the Snake River – Hells Canyon Dam (1967) and Brownlee Dam also permanently block salmon passage. The Oregon Department of Fish and Wildlife often release Chinook salmon on the Powder River for sportfishing at Mason Dam below Phillips Reservoir.

See also
 List of rivers of Oregon
 List of longest streams of Oregon
 List of National Wild and Scenic Rivers

References

External links
Powder Basin Watershed Council
National Wild and Scenic Rivers System

Rivers of Oregon
Wild and Scenic Rivers of the United States
Tributaries of the Snake River
Rivers of Baker County, Oregon
Rivers of Union County, Oregon